Rocky Jerkic (born 1 March 1988) is an Australian professional boxer.  He is currently one of top propects in the Jr. Middleweight division in Australia he holds the Australian super welterweight and IBO Inter-Continental super welterweight titles.

Early life
Born in Darwin, Northern Territory Queensland Australia to an Indigenous Australian mother and Croatian father. Jerkic was raised by his father, his mother left when he was two months old. In 2015 he made contact with his Aboriginal mother for the first time since her departure.

Amateur career
Jerkic, started boxing in Fred Brophy's boxing tent when he was 9, has won 98 of his 104 amateur fights.

Professional career
In 2015 he has won the WBA Asia Pacific super welterweight title with a 3rd round stoppage of Adrian Campbell, vacant IBO Asia Pacific super welterweight title with a 3rd round stoppage of Wiraphot Phaennarong, the vacant IBO Inter-Continental super welterweight title with a Unanimous Decision over Arnel Tinampay and Australia National super welterweight title with an 8th round stoppage over Quade Cooper's trainer Shannon King on the Footy Show Fight Night.

Professional boxing record

| style="text-align:center;" colspan="8"|12 wins (12 knockouts, 3 decision), 0 loss, 0 draws
|-  style="text-align:center; background:#e3e3e3;"
|  style="border-style:none none solid solid; "|Res.
|  style="border-style:none none solid solid; "|Record
|  style="border-style:none none solid solid; "|Opponent
|  style="border-style:none none solid solid; "|Type
|  style="border-style:none none solid solid; "|Round
|  style="border-style:none none solid solid; "|Date
|  style="border-style:none none solid solid; "|Location
|  style="border-style:none none solid solid; "|Notes
|- align=center
|Win
|12–0
|align=left|Shannon King
|TKO
| 8 (10)
|
|align=left|Mansfield Tavern, Mansfield, Queensland, Australia
|align=left|Australian super welterweight title
|- align=center
|Win
|11–0
|align=left|Arnel Tinampay
|UD
| 10 (10)
|
|align=left|Civic Centre, Singleton, New South Wales, Australia
|align=left|vacant International Boxing Organization Inter-Continental super welterweight title
|- align=center
|Win
|10–0
|align=left|Wiraphot Phaennarong
|TKO
| 3 (12)
|
|align=left|Whitlam Leisure Centre, Liverpool, New South Wales, Australia
|align=left|vacant International Boxing Organization Asia Pacific super welterweight title
|- align=center
|Win
|9–0
|align=left|Adrian Campbell
|TKO
| 3 (10)
|
|align=left|Panthers Newcastle, Newcastle West, New South Wales, Australia
|align=left|
|- align=center
|Win
|8–0
|align=left|Alex Ah Tong
|TKO
| 4 (6)
|
|align=left|Panthers Newcastle, Newcastle West, New South Wales, Australia
|align=left|
|- align=center
|Win
|7–0
|align=left|Joe Rea
|TKO
| 1 (4)
|
|align=left|Entertainment Centre, Hurstville, New South Wales, Australia
|align=left|
|- align=center
|Win
|6–0
|align=left|Jody Allen
|TKO
| 1 (4)
|
|align=left|Royal International Convention Centre, Brisbane, Queensland, Australia
|align=left|
|- align=center
|Win
|5–0
|align=left|Daniel Roy Maxwell
|TKO
| 1 (6)
|
|align=left|Orange Function Centre, Orange, New South Wales, Australia
|align=left|
|- align=center
|Win
|4–0
|align=left|Aswin Cabuy
|TD
| 4 (6)
|
|align=left|Croatian Club, Punchbowl, New South Wales, Australia
|align=left|
|- align=center
|Win
|3–0
|align=left|Dinesh Kanth
|KO
| 1 (6)
|
|align=left|The Melbourne Pavilion, Flemington, Victoria, Australia
|align=left|
|- align=center
|Win
|2–0
|align=left|Dickey Peirera
|TKO
| 1 (4)
|
|align=left|Claudelands Arena, Hamilton, New Zealand
|align=left|
|- align=center
|Win
|1–0
|align=left|Stavros Karanicolas
|UD
| 4 (4)
|
|align=left|Entertainment Centre, Newcastle, New South Wales, Australia
|align=left|
|- align=center
|}

References

External links

1989 births
Living people
Australian people of Croatian descent
Australian male boxers
Indigenous Australian boxers
Light-middleweight boxers
Middleweight boxers